was a town located in Shūsō District, Ehime Prefecture, Japan.

As of 2003, the town had an estimated population of 13,354 and a density of 103.44 persons per km2. The total area was 129.10 km2.

On November 1, 2004, Tanbara, along with the city of Tōyo, and the town of Komatsu (also from Shūsō District), was merged into the expanded city of Saijō and no longer exists as an independent municipality.

External links
Official website of Saijō in Japanese

Dissolved municipalities of Ehime Prefecture
Saijō, Ehime